Sköldberg is a Swedish surname. Notable people with the surname include:

Per Olof Sköldberg (1910–1979), Swedish sport shooter
Sigrid Sköldberg-Pettersson (1870–1941), Swedish song lyricist

Swedish-language surnames